Jo-Annie Fortin (born October 25, 1990) was a Canadian synchronized swimmer and Olympian.

Career
Fortin was a member of Canada's national synchronized swimming team.  Competing in the team events she would win bronze medals at the 2009 World Aquatics Championships and the 2011 World Aquatics Championships.  She competed in the women's team event at the 2012 Olympic Games, finishing fourth. She retired from the sport after the 2012 games.

Honours
In 2012 Fortin was awarded a Queen Elizabeth II Diamond Jubilee Medal.

References 

1990 births
Living people
Canadian synchronized swimmers
Olympic synchronized swimmers of Canada
Pan American Games gold medalists for Canada
Pan American Games medalists in synchronized swimming
Swimmers from Montreal
Synchronized swimmers at the 2009 World Aquatics Championships
Synchronized swimmers at the 2011 Pan American Games
Synchronized swimmers at the 2011 World Aquatics Championships
Synchronized swimmers at the 2012 Summer Olympics
World Aquatics Championships medalists in synchronised swimming
Medalists at the 2011 Pan American Games